Darreh Zhaleh may refer to:
 Darreh Zhaleh-ye Olya
 Darreh Zhaleh-ye Sofla